Kouétinfla (also known as Manoufra) is a town in south-central Ivory Coast. It is a sub-prefecture of Sinfra Department in Marahoué Region, Sassandra-Marahoué District.

Kouétinfla was a commune until March 2012, when it became one of 1126 communes nationwide that were abolished.

In 2014, the population of the sub-prefecture of Kouétinfla was 22,181.

Villages
The xx villages of the sub-prefecture of Kouétinfla and their population in 2014 are:
 Akakro (1 126)
 Dogokro (382)
 Dramanékro (1 304)
 Gbrizokro (1 437)
 Gonazofla (1 396)
 Katiénou (1 026)
 Konankouamékro (746)
 Kouadiobakro (772)
 Kouassikro (480)
 Kouetinfla (8 387)
 Kouroudoufla (950)
 Niamienkro (289)
 N'zuekro (457)
 Okakro (665)
 Yanantinfla (1 773)
 Yaokro (991)
plogouhifla

Notes

Sub-prefectures of Marahoué
Former communes of Ivory Coast